California Plateau is an undulating ice-covered plateau,  long and from  wide, which rises to  at the eastern side of Scott Glacier. The northwestern side of the plateau is marked by the steep rock cliffs of Watson Escarpment; the southeastern side grades gradually to the elevation of the interior ice. It was mapped by the United States Geological Survey from ground surveys and from U.S. Navy aerial photography, 1960–64, and named by the Advisory Committee on Antarctic Names for the several branches of the University of California which have sent numerous researchers to work in Antarctica.

See also 
Maaske Dome
Mount Beazley

References 

Plateaus of Antarctica
Landforms of Marie Byrd Land